USA Roller Derby represents the United States in international roller derby, in events such as the Roller Derby World Cup.  The team's first international competition was the 2011 Roller Derby World Cup, where it finished in first place after defeating Team Canada in the final. During the time period referenced here, it was known as "Team USA". A trademark challenge from the United States Olympic Committee led to the change to the name "USA Roller Derby" after the team's last international appearance.

USA Roller Derby is the most successful international roller derby team, having won all three Roller Derby World Cups.

Team roster

2017 team roster
On October 5, 2016, the roster for the 2017 team was announced as follows: (skaters home league at time of announcement):

2014 team roster

On October 15, 2013, the roster for the 2014 World Cup team was announced by Derby News Network as follows (skater's home league at time of announcement listed):

2011 team roster
After a series of tryout camps held throughout 2011 by tournament founder and sponsor Blood and Thunder Magazine, the U.S. team's roster was announced August 4 of that year as follows (home leagues of skaters at time of 2011 World Cup shown; * denotes alternate):

2011 staff

 Head coach: Buster Cheatin'
 Assistant coach: Bonnie D.Stroir
 Team Manager: Rhino
 Team Manager: Endless Justin
 Fundraiser and Merchandise Manager: Vivien Leigh-Em-Out

The team's first practice was held in Denver, Colorado at the Rocky Mountain Rollergirls' War House on November 14, 2011, the Monday following the WFTDA National Championships. A limited number of VIP and general admission tickets were sold, however no press were admitted.

2012 staff

 Head coach: Buster Cheatin'
 Assistant coach: Endless Justin
 Team Manager: Rhino
 Team, Fundraising, and Merchandise Manager: Vivien Leigh-Em-Out

2014 staff

 Head coach: Buster Cheatin'
 Assistant coach: Endless Justin
Assistant coach: Joshua Pfenning
 Team, Fundraising, and Merchandise Manager: Vivien Leigh-Em-Out

2016 staff
 Head coach: Drew Flowers
 Assistant coach: Tim Burns
 Team, Fundraising, and Merchandise Manager: Vivien Leigh-Em-Out

2011 Roller Derby World Cup
The team then known as "Team USA"'s first international action took place December 1 through 4, 2011, at the premiere Roller Derby World Cup, held in Toronto, Ontario, Canada. The U.S., one of 13 nations competing, began group play at the tournament in Group C, along with teams representing New Zealand and Scotland. The U.S. won both of its group bouts, defeating New Zealand 377 to 8 on the first day of the tournament, and Scotland on the second day, 435 to 1. On the night of the tournament's first day, the USA staged an exhibition bout, dividing its large roster into two teams nicknamed the Stars and the Stripes.

By virtue of the large point spread for the U.S. in their group bouts, the team was seeded first overall for the remainder of the tournament, and earned a bye past the first elimination round. In the quarter finals, the U.S. faced New Zealand for the second time, winning this time by a score of 437 to 8. In the semi final, the U.S. defeated Team Australia 532 to 4, in what was both the highest score and largest margin of victory for the entire tournament. In the final of the tournament,  the U.S. defeated Team Canada 336 to 33.  Joy Collision was voted MVP for  the U.S. at the World Cup.

References

USA
Roller derby
Roller derby in the United States
2011 establishments in the United States
Sports clubs established in 2011